Perumthachan is a 1991 Indian Malayalam-language Period drama film directed by Ajayan and written by M. T. Vasudevan Nair. It is based on Perumthachan of the Parayi Petta Panthirukulam, a legend in the Kerala folklore. The problems caused by the generation gap are explored through the relationship between a skilled carpenter and his tradition-breaking son. The film won the National Film Award for Best First Film of a Director and Filmfare Award for Best Film - Malayalam.

Plot 
In this Indian story, based on a Kerala legend, a pious and self-disciplined master carpenter of a supposedly mixed-caste, moves easily in his world, building temples and then carving the stone statues which embellish them. He is at home in his traditional world, is at peace with his inner self and the social mores of the time. By way of contrast, he begets a son who is of rebellious nature and questioning of the traditional social hierarchies of the time. He falls in love with the daughter of a royal household which ultimately leads to his demise.

Raman Perumthachan is unsurpassed as a wood-carver, sculptor and architect and his creations were so exquisite that he was regarded a reincarnation of the architect of the gods. He was also a man of great erudition. Though brought up as a carpenter, he was alluded to be the son of a Brahmin. Perumthachan himself doubted this supposition and in one part of the film he smiles approvingly when his son suggests to him that perhaps the made up story about his Brahmanical antecedents was a ruse by the upper castes to lay claim to some of his ability and prestige.

The screenplay begins at dusk with an old ambalavasi trying to light a stone lamp. But due to a strong gust of wind the lamp struggles to remain alight. A man lying in the tanner pandal close by gets up and places a stone slab strategically in such a way  that the path of the wind is breached. He wears a sacred thread(poonool) and hence is mistaken for a Namboodiri. But he tells the ambalavasi that he is no Namboodiri, but a carpenter who had forgotten to remove his thread which he had worn during the construction of a temple. Immediately the ambalavasi recognises that this was no ordinary carpenter but the legendary Perumthachan himself. News spreads about the arrival of Perumthachan.

He meets up with a rich Brahmin who was his childhood friend and who is now the Thampuran of a rich royal household(Kovilakam). He is requested to oversee the construction of the family's shrine and the sculpting of the image of the goddess. The ravishing beauty of the Brahmin householder's wife Bhargavi Thampuratti catches his imagination and he sculpts the face of the goddess in the mould of the Thampuratti. Though a man of principles, Perumthachan feels drawn to the woman whose looks he compares to 'Swayamvara Durga'; but steps back, knowing well the consequences of any indiscretion on his part. This apparent attraction leads to a minor misunderstanding towards  Perumtachan in the mind of the Thampuran and consequently he is not allowed to complete the work on the idol to his satisfaction and is insulted by the Thampuran during the consecration of the idol. Perunthachan leaves the place disillusioned.

Years roll on and his son Kannan has grown into an insightful young man of great charms and talent. Perumthachan is proud of his son's abilities and pleased by his son's growing reputation, but is also worried by his son's tendency to overlook the traditional rules and values of sculptural art and by the strain of unscrupulousness in the son which is a mark of the new, more materialistic and self-centred generation. It is Perumthachan's long cherished wish that he be the one who builds the Saraswati mandapam which Bhargavi Thamburatti had desired for. Kunhikkavu Thamburatti, the daughter agrees to her late mother's wish, but it is Kannan, not Perumthachan, who is called up to do the work. The young man goes to the very household of the same rich Brahmin for whom his father had carved the image of the goddess years ago and designs and supervises the building of the temple. In an ironical repetition of his father's experience, he falls in love with Kunhikkavu. But unlike his father, he does not hold himself back and a scandal erupts in the royal household. The girl's father tells perumthachan that he even wished that kannan died falling off from the construction rather than creating shame to the royal household. Seeing that the scandal is slowly destroying his old patron, the father of the girl, Perumthachan arrives to oversee the construction of the temple. He tries to cajole his son to walk away from his relationship. The son refuses to yield and the distraught Perunthachan, in a final act of desperation, drops his chisel deliberately on his son's neck, killing him during the work of the final touches to the dome of the temple.

Cast 
 Thilakan -  Raman Perumthachan
 Prashanth -  Kannan 
 Vinaya Prasad - Bhargavi Thampuratti
 Nedumudi Venu   -  Unni Thampuran
 Monisha Unni -   Kunjikkavu Thamburatti
 Jalaja - Devaki
 Manoj K. Jayan - Thirumangalam Neelakantan Nair
 M.S. Thripunithura -  Maani Embrandiri
 Babu Namboothiri - Kesavan
 T. P. Madhavan - Pramani, the village chief
 Kozhikode Narayanan Nair - Nedumbaram Mooss
 Adoor Pankajam - Unnimaya Valyamma
 Prabhakaran - Variar
 Sreelatha Menon - Thozhi
 Kozhikode Sarada - Keshavan's mother

Crew
 Director: Ajayan
 Screenplay: M. T. Vasudevan Nair
 Cinematography: Santhosh Sivan
 Editing: M. S. Money
 Art: P. Krishnamoorthy
 Associate director: Unni Narayanan

Production
This film was directed by Ajayan with Santosh Sivan as the cinematographer. The story was written by M.T. Vasudevan Nair and the warm background music was composed by Johnson.

M.T. Vasudevan Nair has told this legendary story of the master carpenter with finesse, bringing to mind the old rituals and traditions and a world since long forgotten. He systematically builds up the suspense until ultimately the ending comes upon you surprisingly, almost shockingly, leaving you cold and unbelieving. In the afterword to his book The Master Carpenter, M. T. Vasudevan Nair wrote that Ajayan first approached him for a screenplay of his story Manikkakkallu. That did not materialise and later he approached with another dream project Perumthachan. In the end of the afterword, M. T. thanks Ajayan for persuading him to write screenplay for Perumthachan.

Awards
The film won Filmfare Award for Best Film - Malayalam received by G. Jayakumar
National Film Award for Best Cinematography was won by Santhosh Sivan

References

External links
 

1990 films
1990s Malayalam-language films
Films with screenplays by M. T. Vasudevan Nair
Films whose cinematographer won the Best Cinematography National Film Award
Best Debut Feature Film of a Director National Film Award winners
Films scored by Johnson